Our Shining Days  is a 2017 Chinese coming-of-age musical film starring Xu Lu and Peng Yuchang. The film has received favorable reviews, particularly for the performance of lead actress Xu Lu and the depiction of minority group's struggles of Chinese orchestra and Otaku.

Synopsis
In a fictitious music school, the students of Chinese orchestra and Classical orchestra don't get along with each other. They call each other "tacky" and "pretentious". Chen Jing, a quirky but talented yangqin student, initially doesn't care about the rivalry, until she falls for the piano prodigy Wang Wen. Annoyed at his ignorance and prejudice toward Chinese instruments, she is determined to prove herself to him by forming her own ensemble, which consists of her best friend who secretly loves her Li You and four Otaku girls whom initially only agreed to join because of Chen Jing's promise to buy them expensive action figures. They named their concert band "2.5 Dimension", meaning a blend between 2D and 3D worlds, as the Otaku people refer to themselves as living in the second dimension. They perform at an Animation, Comics, and Games convention, and after initial rejection the crowd cheers for them.

They perform for Wang Wen but he publicly rejects Chen Jing and traditional Chinese music. Crushed, Chen Jing chooses to disband 2.5 Dimension. The four Otaku students, who have grown to love the band, are angry and refuse Chen Jing's gift of expensive anime figurines. Chen Jing's mother tells her about how the yangqin is a part of her and that she can't give up playing it without its permission.  The head of the school announces plans to cancel the Chinese Orchestra but the original members of 2.5 Dimension are joined by other students to protest. After the head of the school continues to refuse them, they organize a music competition with the Classical Orchestra. An inspector comes to the school and both orchestras play their music, but the classical students are unable to keep up with the Chinese orchestra, and so lose the competition. The Chinese orchestra then enlist the help of the Classical orchestra to sneak in and unofficially play after their performance, which is being broadcast live. They play right at the end, and are met with high praise.

Casting
Xu Lu as Chen Jing, student from the music school's Chinese Music Area who plays the Yangqin 
Peng Yuchang as Li You, percussionist playing Chinese drums
Liu Yongxi as Xiao Mai, plays the Guzheng 
Li Nuo as Ying Zi, plays the Erhu 
Lu Zhaohua as Beibei, plays the Ruan 
Han Zhongyu  as Tata, plays the Pipa 
Luo Mingjie as Wang Wen, plays classical piano
Chen Yusi as Zheng Youen
Eason Chan as Ministry of Education's official
Yan Ni as Mrs. Chen
Geng Le as Mr. Chen

Reception
Our Shining Days garnered generally-positive response. Edmund Lee of South China Morning Post rated the film 3 out of 5 stars, describing it as "slight but entertaining" while highlighting the film's "youthful spirit".

Awards and nominations

References

External links
 
 Our Shining Days at Douban

2017 films
2017 drama films
2010s coming-of-age drama films
2010s musical drama films
2010s teen drama films
Chinese coming-of-age drama films
Chinese musical drama films
Chinese teen films
Chinese-language films
Films set in China
Tencent Pictures films